This is a list of the bird species recorded in Russia. The avifauna of Russia include a total of 808 species, 2 of which one are endemic, 68 species are globally threatened, and 2 species are extinct.

This list's taxonomic treatment (designation and sequence of orders, families and species) and nomenclature (common and scientific names) follow the conventions of The Clements Checklist of Birds of the World, 2022 edition. The family accounts at the beginning of each heading reflect this taxonomy, as do the species counts found in each family account. Accidental species are included in the total species count for Russia.

The following tags have been used to highlight several categories. The commonly occurring native species do not fall into any of these categories.

(A) Accidental - a species that rarely or accidentally occurs in Russia
(Ext) Extirpated - a species which no longer occurs in Russia, but other populations still exist elsewhere
(Ex) Extinct - a species which no longer exists
(E) Endemic - a species endemic to Russia
(I) Introduced - a species introduced to Russia as a consequence, direct or indirect, of human actions

Ducks, geese, and waterfowl
Order: AnseriformesFamily: Anatidae

Anatidae includes the ducks and most duck-like waterfowl, such as geese and swans. These birds are adapted to an aquatic existence with webbed feet, flattened bills, and feathers that are excellent at shedding water due to an oily coating.

Bar-headed goose, Anser indicus
Emperor goose, Anser canagica
Snow goose, Anser caerulescens
Ross's goose, Anser rossii (A)
Graylag goose, Anser anser
Swan goose, Anser cygnoides
Greater white-fronted goose, Anser albifrons
Lesser white-fronted goose, Anser erythropus
Taiga bean-goose, Anser fabalis
Tundra bean-goose, Anser serrirostris
Pink-footed goose, Anser brachyrhynchus (A)
Brant, Branta bernicla
Barnacle goose, Branta leucopsis
Cackling goose, Branta hutchinsii (A)
Canada goose, Branta canadensis (I)
Red-breasted goose, Branta ruficollis
Mute swan, Cygnus olor
Trumpeter swan, Cygnus buccinator (A)
Tundra swan, Cygnus columbianus
Whooper swan, Cygnus cygnus
Ruddy shelduck, Tadorna ferruginea
Common shelduck, Tadorna tadorna
Crested shelduck, Tadorna cristata (A)
Mandarin duck, Aix galericulata
Baikal teal, Sibirionetta formosa
Garganey, Spatula querquedula
Northern shoveler, Spatula clypeata
Gadwall, Mareca strepera
Falcated duck, Mareca falcata
Eurasian wigeon, Mareca penelope
American wigeon, Mareca americana (A)
Indian spot-billed duck, Anas poecilorhyncha
Eastern spot-billed duck, Anas zonorhyncha
Mallard, Anas platyrhynchos
Northern pintail, Anas acuta
Green-winged teal, Anas crecca
Marbled teal, Marmaronetta angustirostris
Red-crested pochard, Netta rufina
Canvasback, Aythya valisineria (A)
Redhead, Aythya americana (A)
Common pochard, Aythya ferina
Ring-necked duck, Aythya collaris (A)
Ferruginous duck, Aythya nyroca
Baer's pochard, Aythya baeri
Tufted duck, Aythya fuligula
Greater scaup, Aythya marila
Lesser scaup, Aythya affinis (A)
Steller's eider, Polysticta stelleri
Spectacled eider, Somateria fischeri
King eider, Somateria spectabilis
Common eider, Somateria mollissima
Harlequin duck, Histrionicus histrionicus
Surf scoter, Melanitta perspicillata (A)
Velvet scoter, Melanitta fusca
White-winged scoter, Melanitta deglandi (A)
Stejneger's scoter, Melanitta stejnegeri
Common scoter, Melanitta nigra
Black scoter, Melanitta americana
Long-tailed duck, Clangula hyemalis
Bufflehead, Bucephala albeola (A)
Common goldeneye, Bucephala clangula
Barrow's goldeneye, Bucephala islandica (A)
Smew, Mergellus albellus
Common merganser, Mergus merganser
Red-breasted merganser, Mergus serrator
Scaly-sided merganser, Mergus squamatus
Ruddy duck, Oxyura jamaicensis (I)
White-headed duck, Oxyura leucocephala

Pheasants, grouse, and allies
Order: GalliformesFamily: Phasianidae

The Phasianidae are a family of terrestrial birds. In general, they are plump (although they vary in size) and have broad, relatively short wings.

Japanese quail, Coturnix japonica
Common quail, Coturnix coturnix
Chukar, Alectoris chukar
Caucasian snowcock, Tetraogallus caucasicus
Altai snowcock, Tetraogallus altaicus
Ring-necked pheasant, Phasianus colchicus
Gray partridge, Perdix perdix
Daurian partridge, Perdix dauurica
Black-billed capercaillie, Tetrao urogalloides
Western capercaillie, Tetrao urogallus
Black grouse, Lyrurus tetrix
Caucasian grouse, Lyrurus mlokosiewiczi
Hazel grouse, Tetrastes bonasia
Siberian grouse, Dendragapus falcipennis (E)
Willow ptarmigan, Lagopus lagopus
Rock ptarmigan, Lagopus muta

Flamingos
Order: PhoenicopteriformesFamily: Phoenicopteridae

Flamingos filter-feed on shellfish and algae. Their oddly shaped beaks are specially adapted to separate mud and silt from the food they consume and, uniquely, are used upside-down.

Greater flamingo, Phoenicopterus roseus

Grebes
Order: PodicipediformesFamily: Podicipedidae

Grebes are small to medium-large freshwater diving birds. They have lobed toes and are excellent swimmers and divers. However, they have their feet placed far back on the body, making them quite ungainly on land.

Little grebe, Tachybaptus ruficollis
Horned grebe, Podiceps auritus
Red-necked grebe, Podiceps grisegena
Great crested grebe, Podiceps cristatus
Eared grebe, Podiceps nigricollis

Pigeons and doves
Order: ColumbiformesFamily: Columbidae

Pigeons and doves are stout-bodied birds with short necks and short slender bills with a fleshy cere.

Rock pigeon, Columba livia
Hill pigeon, Columba rupestris
Stock dove, Columba oenas
Yellow-eyed pigeon, Columba eversmanni (A)
Common wood-pigeon, Columba palumbus
European turtle-dove, Streptopelia turtur
Oriental turtle-dove, Streptopelia orientalis
Eurasian collared-dove, Streptopelia decaocto
Red collared-dove, Streptopelia tranquebarica (A)
Laughing dove, Spilopelia senegalensis
Namaqua dove, Oena capensis (A)
White-bellied green-pigeon, Treron sieboldii

Sandgrouse
Order: PterocliformesFamily: Pteroclidae

Sandgrouse have small, pigeon like heads and necks, but sturdy compact bodies. They have long pointed wings and sometimes tails and a fast direct flight. Flocks fly to watering holes at dawn and dusk. Their legs are feathered down to the toes.

Pallas's sandgrouse, Syrrhaptes paradoxus
Pin-tailed sandgrouse, Pterocles alchata (A)
Black-bellied sandgrouse, Pterocles orientalis

Bustards
Order: OtidiformesFamily: Otididae

Bustards are large terrestrial birds mainly associated with dry open country and steppes in the Old World. They are omnivorous and nest on the ground. They walk steadily on strong legs and big toes, pecking for food as they go. They have long broad wings with "fingered" wingtips and striking patterns in flight. Many have interesting mating displays.

Great bustard, Otis tarda
Macqueen's bustard, Chlamydotis macqueenii
Little bustard, Tetrax tetrax

Cuckoos
Order: CuculiformesFamily: Cuculidae

The family Cuculidae includes cuckoos, roadrunners and anis. These birds are of variable size with slender bodies, long tails and strong legs. The Old World cuckoos are brood parasites.

Northern hawk-cuckoo, Hierococcyx hyperythrus
Lesser cuckoo, Cuculus poliocephalus
Indian cuckoo, Cuculus micropterus
Common cuckoo, Cuculus canorus
Oriental cuckoo, Cuculus saturatus

Nightjars and allies
Order: CaprimulgiformesFamily: Caprimulgidae

Nightjars are medium-sized nocturnal birds that usually nest on the ground. They have long wings, short legs and very short bills. Most have small feet, of little use for walking, and long pointed wings. Their soft plumage is camouflaged to resemble bark or leaves.

Gray nightjar, Caprimulgus jotaka
Eurasian nightjar, Caprimulgus europaeus

Swifts
Order: CaprimulgiformesFamily: Apodidae

Swifts are small birds which spend the majority of their lives flying. These birds have very short legs and never settle voluntarily on the ground, perching instead only on vertical surfaces. Many swifts have long swept-back wings which resemble a crescent or boomerang.

White-throated needletail, Hirundapus caudacutus
Alpine swift, Tachymarptis melba
Common swift, Apus apus
Pacific swift, Apus pacificus

Hummingbirds
Order: CaprimulgiformesFamily: Trochilidae

Hummingbirds are small birds capable of hovering in mid-air due to the rapid flapping of their wings. They are the only birds that can fly backwards.

Rufous hummingbird, Selasphorus rufus (A)

Rails, gallinules, and coots
Order: GruiformesFamily: Rallidae

Rallidae is a large family of small to medium-sized birds which includes the rails, crakes, coots and gallinules. Typically they inhabit dense vegetation in damp environments near lakes, swamps or rivers. In general they are shy and secretive birds, making them difficult to observe. Most species have strong legs and long toes which are well adapted to soft uneven surfaces. They tend to have short, rounded wings and to be weak fliers.

Water rail, Rallus aquaticus
Brown-cheeked rail, Rallus indicus
Corn crake, Crex crex
Sora, Porzana carolina
Spotted crake, Porzana porzana
Eurasian moorhen, Gallinula chloropus
Eurasian coot, Fulica atra
African swamphen, Porphyrio madagascariensis (A)
Gray-headed swamphen, Porphyrio poliocephalus
Watercock, Gallicrex cinerea
White-breasted waterhen, Amaurornis phoenicurus (A)
Ruddy-breasted crake, Zapornia fusca
Band-bellied crake, Zapornia paykullii
Little crake, Zapornia parva
Baillon's crake, Zapornia pusilla
Swinhoe's rail, Coturnicops exquisitus

Cranes
Order: GruiformesFamily: Gruidae

Cranes are large, long-legged and long-necked birds. Unlike the similar-looking but unrelated herons, cranes fly with necks outstretched, not pulled back. Most have elaborate and noisy courting displays or "dances".

Demoiselle crane, Anthropoides virgo
Siberian crane, Leucogeranus leucogeranus
Sandhill crane, Antigone canadensis
White-naped crane, Antigone vipio
Common crane, Grus grus
Hooded crane, Grus monacha
Red-crowned crane, Grus japonensis

Thick-knees
Order: CharadriiformesFamily: Burhinidae

The thick-knees are a group of largely tropical waders in the family Burhinidae. They are found worldwide within the tropical zone, with some species also breeding in temperate Europe and Australia. They are medium to large waders with strong black or yellow-black bills, large yellow eyes and cryptic plumage. Despite being classed as waders, most species have a preference for arid or semi-arid habitats.

Eurasian thick-knee, Burhinus oedicnemus

Stilts and avocets
Order: CharadriiformesFamily: Recurvirostridae

Recurvirostridae is a family of large wading birds, which includes the avocets and stilts. The avocets have long legs and long up-curved bills. The stilts have extremely long legs and long, thin, straight bills.

Black-winged stilt, Himantopus himantopus
Pied avocet, Recurvirostra avosetta

Ibisbill
Order: CharadriiformesFamily: Ibidorhynchidae

Ibisbill, Ibidorhyncha struthersii (A)

Oystercatchers
Order: CharadriiformesFamily: Haematopodidae

The oystercatchers are large and noisy plover-like birds, with strong bills used for smashing or prising open molluscs.

Eurasian oystercatcher, Haematopus ostralegus
Black oystercatcher, Haematopus bachmani

Plovers and lapwings
Order: CharadriiformesFamily: Charadriidae

The family Charadriidae includes the plovers, dotterels and lapwings. They are small to medium-sized birds with compact bodies, short, thick necks and long, usually pointed, wings. They are found in open country worldwide, mostly in habitats near water.

Black-bellied plover, Pluvialis squatarola
European golden-plover, Pluvialis apricaria
American golden-plover, Pluvialis dominica
Pacific golden-plover, Pluvialis fulva
Northern lapwing, Vanellus vanellus
Gray-headed lapwing, Vanellus cinereus (A)
Red-wattled lapwing, Vanellus indicus (A)
Sociable lapwing, Vanellus gregarius
White-tailed lapwing, Vanellus leucurus
Lesser sand-plover, Charadrius mongolus
Greater sand-plover, Charadrius leschenaultii
Caspian plover, Charadrius asiaticus
Kentish plover, Charadrius alexandrinus
Common ringed plover, Charadrius hiaticula
Semipalmated plover, Charadrius semipalmatus
Long-billed plover, Charadrius placidus
Little ringed plover, Charadrius dubius
Killdeer, Charadrius vociferus (A)
Oriental plover, Charadrius veredus
Eurasian dotterel, Charadrius morinellus

Painted-snipes
Order: CharadriiformesFamily: Rostratulidae

Painted-snipes are short-legged, long-billed birds similar in shape to the true snipes, but more brightly coloured.

Greater painted-snipe, Rostratula benghalensis

Jacanas
Order: CharadriiformesFamily: Jacanidae

The jacanas are a group of tropical waders in the family Jacanidae. They are found throughout the tropics. They are identifiable by their huge feet and claws which enable them to walk on floating vegetation in the shallow lakes that are their preferred habitat.

Pheasant-tailed jacana, Hydrophasianus chirurgus (A)

Sandpipers and allies
Order: CharadriiformesFamily: Scolopacidae

Scolopacidae is a large diverse family of small to medium-sized shorebirds including the sandpipers, curlews, godwits, shanks, tattlers, woodcocks, snipes, dowitchers and phalaropes. The majority of these species eat small invertebrates picked out of the mud or soil. Variation in length of legs and bills enables multiple species to feed in the same habitat, particularly on the coast, without direct competition for food.

Bristle-thighed curlew, Numenius tahitiensis  (A)
Whimbrel, Numenius phaeopus
Little curlew, Numenius minutus
Eskimo curlew, Numenius borealis (A)
Far Eastern curlew, Numenius madagascariensis
Slender-billed curlew, Numenius tenuirostris
Eurasian curlew, Numenius arquata
Bar-tailed godwit, Limosa lapponica
Black-tailed godwit, Limosa limosa
Ruddy turnstone, Arenaria interpres
Black turnstone, Arenaria melanocephala (A)
Great knot, Calidris tenuirostris
Red knot, Calidris canutus
Ruff, Calidris pugnax
Broad-billed sandpiper, Calidris falcinellus
Sharp-tailed sandpiper, Calidris acuminata
Curlew sandpiper, Calidris ferruginea
Temminck's stint, Calidris temminckii
Long-toed stint, Calidris subminuta
Spoon-billed sandpiper, Calidris pygmeus
Red-necked stint, Calidris ruficollis
Sanderling, Calidris alba
Dunlin, Calidris alpina
Rock sandpiper, Calidris ptilocnemis
Purple sandpiper, Calidris maritima
Baird's sandpiper, Calidris bairdii
Little stint, Calidris minuta
Least sandpiper, Calidris minutilla (A)
White-rumped sandpiper, Calidris fuscicollis (A)
Buff-breasted sandpiper, Calidris subruficollis
Pectoral sandpiper, Calidris melanotos
Semipalmated sandpiper, Calidris pusilla 
Western sandpiper, Calidris mauri
Asian dowitcher, Limnodromus semipalmatus
Long-billed dowitcher, Limnodromus scolopaceus
Jack snipe, Lymnocryptes minimus
Eurasian woodcock, Scolopax rusticola
Solitary snipe, Gallinago solitaria
Latham's snipe, Gallinago hardwickii
Great snipe, Gallinago media
Common snipe, Gallinago gallinago
Wilson's snipe, Gallinago delicata
Pin-tailed snipe, Gallinago stenura
Swinhoe's snipe, Gallinago megala
Terek sandpiper, Xenus cinereus
Red-necked phalarope, Phalaropus lobatus
Red phalarope, Phalaropus fulicarius
Common sandpiper, Actitis hypoleucos
Spotted sandpiper, Actitis macularia (A)
Green sandpiper, Tringa ochropus
Gray-tailed tattler, Tringa brevipes
Wandering tattler, Tringa incana
Spotted redshank, Tringa erythropus
Greater yellowlegs, Tringa melanoleuca (A)
Common greenshank, Tringa nebularia
Nordmann's greenshank, Tringa guttifer
Lesser yellowlegs, Tringa flavipes (A)
Marsh sandpiper, Tringa stagnatilis
Wood sandpiper, Tringa glareola
Common redshank, Tringa totanus

Buttonquail
Order: CharadriiformesFamily: Turnicidae

The buttonquail are small, drab, running birds which resemble the true quails. The female is the brighter of the sexes and initiates courtship. The male incubates the eggs and tends the young.

Yellow-legged buttonquail, Turnix tanki

Pratincoles and coursers
Order: CharadriiformesFamily: Glareolidae

Glareolidae is a family of wading birds comprising the pratincoles, which have short legs, long pointed wings and long forked tails, and the coursers, which have long legs, short wings and long, pointed bills which curve downwards. There are 4 species which occur in Russia.

Cream-colored courser, Cursorius cursor (A)
Collared pratincole, Glareola pratincola
Oriental pratincole, Glareola maldivarum
Black-winged pratincole, Glareola nordmanni

Skuas and jaegers
Order: CharadriiformesFamily: Stercorariidae

The family Stercorariidae are, in general, medium to large birds, typically with grey or brown plumage, often with white markings on the wings. They nest on the ground in temperate and arctic regions and are long-distance migrants. There are 5 species which occur in Russia.

Great skua, Stercorarius skua
South polar skua, Stercorarius maccormicki
Pomarine jaeger, Stercorarius pomarinus
Parasitic jaeger, Stercorarius parasiticus
Long-tailed jaeger, Stercorarius longicaudus

Auks, murres, and puffins
Order: CharadriiformesFamily: Alcidae

Alcids are superficially similar to penguins due to their black-and-white colours, their upright posture and some of their habits, however they are not related to the penguins and differ in being able to fly. Auks live on the open sea, only deliberately coming ashore to nest.

Dovekie, Alle alle
Common murre, Uria aalge
Thick-billed murre, Uria lomvia
Razorbill, Alca torda
Great auk, Pinguinus impennis (A)(Ex)
Black guillemot, Cepphus grylle
Pigeon guillemot, Cepphus columba
Spectacled guillemot, Cepphus carbo
Long-billed murrelet, Brachyramphus perdix
Marbled murrelet, Brachyramphus marmoratus (A)
Kittlitz's murrelet, Brachyramphus brevirostris
Ancient murrelet, Synthliboramphus antiquus
Japanese murrelet, Synthliboramphus wumizusume
Cassin's auklet, Ptychoramphus aleuticus
Parakeet auklet, Aethia psittacula
Least auklet, Aethia pusilla
Whiskered auklet, Aethia pygmaea
Crested auklet, Aethia cristatella
Rhinoceros auklet, Cerorhinca monocerata
Atlantic puffin, Fratercula arctica
Horned puffin, Fratercula corniculata
Tufted puffin, Fratercula cirrhata

Gulls, terns, and skimmers
Order: CharadriiformesFamily: Laridae

Laridae is a family of medium to large seabirds, the gulls, terns, and skimmers. Gulls are typically grey or white, often with black markings on the head or wings. They have stout, longish bills and webbed feet. Terns are a group of generally medium to large seabirds typically with grey or white plumage, often with black markings on the head. Most terns hunt fish by diving but some pick insects off the surface of fresh water. Terns are generally long-lived birds, with several species known to live in excess of 30 years.

Black-legged kittiwake, Rissa tridactyla
Red-legged kittiwake, Rissa brevirostris
Ivory gull, Pagophila eburnea
Sabine's gull, Xema sabini
Saunders's gull, Saundersilarus saundersi (A)
Slender-billed gull, Chroicocephalus genei
Bonaparte's gull, Chroicocephalus philadelphia
Black-headed gull, Chroicocephalus ridibundus
Brown-headed gull, Chroicocephalus brunnicephalus (A)
Little gull, Hydrocoloeus minutus
Ross's gull, Rhodostethia rosea
Mediterranean gull, Ichthyaetus melanocephalus
Relict gull, Ichthyaetus relictus
Pallas's gull, Ichthyaetus ichthyaetus
Audouin's gull, Ichthyaetus audouinii (A)
Black-tailed gull, Larus crassirostris
Common gull, Larus canus
Short-billed gull, Larus brachyrhynchus (A)
Ring-billed gull, Larus delawarensis (A)
Herring gull, Larus argentatus
Yellow-legged gull, Larus michahellis (A)
Caspian gull, Larus cachinnans
Iceland gull, Larus glaucoides
Lesser black-backed gull, Larus fuscus
Slaty-backed gull, Larus schistisagus
Glaucous-winged gull, Larus glaucescens
Glaucous gull, Larus hyperboreus
Great black-backed gull, Larus marinus
Aleutian tern, Onychoprion aleutica
Little tern, Sternula albifrons
Gull-billed tern, Gelochelidon nilotica
Caspian tern, Hydroprogne caspia
Black tern, Chlidonias niger
White-winged tern, Chlidonias leucopterus
Whiskered tern, Chlidonias hybrida
Common tern, Sterna hirundo
Arctic tern, Sterna paradisaea
Sandwich tern, Thalasseus sandvicensis

Loons
Order: GaviiformesFamily: Gaviidae

Loons, known as divers in Europe, are a group of aquatic birds found in many parts of North America and northern Europe. They are the size of a large duck or small goose, which they somewhat resemble when swimming, but to which they are completely unrelated. There are 5 species which occur in Russia.

Red-throated loon, Gavia stellata
Arctic loon, Gavia arctica
Pacific loon, Gavia pacifica
Common loon, Gavia immer (A)
Yellow-billed loon, Gavia adamsii

Albatrosses
Order: ProcellariiformesFamily: Diomedeidae

The albatrosses are among the largest of flying birds, and the great albatrosses from the genus Diomedea have the largest wingspans of any extant birds. There are 3 species which occur in Russia.

Laysan albatross, Phoebastria immutabilis
Black-footed albatross, Phoebastria nigripes
Short-tailed albatross, Phoebastria albatrus

Northern storm-petrels
Order: ProcellariiformesFamily: Hydrobatidae

The northern storm-petrels are relatives of the petrels and are the smallest seabirds. They feed on planktonic crustaceans and small fish picked from the surface, typically while hovering. The flight is fluttering and sometimes bat-like.

European storm-petrel, Hydrobates pelagicus (A)
Fork-tailed storm-petrel, Hydrobates furcatus
Leach's storm-petrel, Hydrobates leucorhous
Swinhoe's storm-petrel, Hydrobates monorhis

Shearwaters and petrels
Order: ProcellariiformesFamily: Procellariidae

The procellariids are the main group of medium-sized "true petrels", characterised by united nostrils with medium septum and a long outer functional primary.

Northern fulmar, Fulmarus glacialis
Providence petrel, Pterodroma solandri (A)
Mottled petrel, Pterodroma inexpectata 
White-necked petrel, Pterodroma cervicalis (A)
Bonin petrel, Pterodroma hypoleuca
Streaked shearwater, Calonectris leucomelas
Flesh-footed shearwater, Ardenna carneipes
Great shearwater, Ardenna gravis (A)
Buller's shearwater, Ardenna bulleri
Sooty shearwater, Ardenna griseus
Short-tailed shearwater, Ardenna tenuirostris
Manx shearwater, Puffinus puffinus (A)
Yelkouan shearwater, Puffinus yelkouan

Storks
Order: CiconiiformesFamily: Ciconiidae

Storks are large, long-legged, long-necked, wading birds with long, stout bills. Storks are mute, but bill-clattering is an important mode of communication at the nest. Their nests can be large and may be reused for many years. Many species are migratory..

Black stork, Ciconia nigra
White stork, Ciconia ciconia
Oriental stork, Ciconia boyciana

Frigatebirds
Order: SuliformesFamily: Fregatidae

Frigatebirds are large seabirds usually found over tropical oceans. They are large, black-and-white or completely black, with long wings and deeply forked tails. The males have coloured inflatable throat pouches. They do not swim or walk and cannot take off from a flat surface. Having the largest wingspan-to-body-weight ratio of any bird, they are essentially aerial, able to stay aloft for more than a week.

Lesser frigatebird, Fregata ariel (A)
Great frigatebird, Fregata minor (A)

Boobies and gannets
Order: SuliformesFamily: Sulidae

The sulids comprise the gannets and boobies. Both groups are medium to large coastal seabirds that plunge-dive for fish.

Brown booby, Sula leucogaster (A)
Red-footed booby, Sula sula (A)
Northern gannet, Morus bassanus

Cormorants and shags
Order: SuliformesFamily: Phalacrocoracidae

Phalacrocoracidae is a family of medium to large coastal, fish-eating seabirds that includes cormorants and shags. Plumage colouration varies, with the majority having mainly dark plumage, some species being black-and-white and a few being colourful.

Pygmy cormorant, Microcarbo pygmeus
Red-faced cormorant, Urile urile
Pelagic cormorant, Urile pelagicus
Pallas's cormorant, Urile perspicillatus (E)(Ex)
Great cormorant, Phalacrocorax carbo
Japanese cormorant, Phalacrocorax capillatus
European shag, Gulosus aristotelis
Double-crested cormorant, Nannopterum auritum (A)

Pelicans
Order: PelecaniformesFamily: Pelecanidae

Pelicans are large water birds with a distinctive pouch under their beak. As with other members of the order Pelecaniformes, they have webbed feet with four toes.

Great white pelican, Pelecanus onocrotalus
Dalmatian pelican, Pelecanus crispus

Herons, egrets, and bitterns
Order: PelecaniformesFamily: Ardeidae

The family Ardeidae contains the bitterns, herons and egrets. Herons and egrets are medium to large wading birds with long necks and legs. Bitterns tend to be shorter necked and more wary. Members of Ardeidae fly with their necks retracted, unlike other long-necked birds such as storks, ibises and spoonbills.

Great bittern, Botaurus stellaris
Yellow bittern, Ixobrychus sinensis
Little bittern, Ixobrychus minutus
Schrenck's bittern, Ixobrychus eurhythmus
Cinnamon bittern, Ixobrychus cinnamomeus (A)
Gray heron, Ardea cinerea
Purple heron, Ardea purpurea
Great egret, Ardea alba
Intermediate egret, Ardea intermedia
Chinese egret, Egretta eulophotes
Little egret, Egretta garzetta
Cattle egret, Bubulcus ibis
Squacco heron, Ardeola ralloides
Chinese pond-heron, Ardeola bacchus (A)
Striated heron, Butorides striata
Black-crowned night-heron, Nycticorax nycticorax
Japanese night-heron, Gorsachius goisagi (A)

Ibises and spoonbills
Order: PelecaniformesFamily: Threskiornithidae

Threskiornithidae is a family of large terrestrial and wading birds which includes the ibises and spoonbills. They have long, broad wings with 11 primary and about 20 secondary feathers. They are strong fliers and despite their size and weight, very capable soarers.

Glossy ibis, Plegadis falcinellus
African sacred ibis, Threskiornis aethiopicus (A)
Black-headed ibis, Threskiornis melanocephalus (A)
Crested ibis, Nipponia nippon (Ext)
Eurasian spoonbill, Platalea leucorodia
Black-faced spoonbill, Platalea minor (A)

Osprey
Order: AccipitriformesFamily: Pandionidae

The family Pandionidae contains only one species, the osprey. The osprey is a medium-large raptor which is a specialist fish-eater with a worldwide distribution.

Osprey, Pandion haliaetus

Hawks, eagles, and kites
Order: AccipitriformesFamily: Accipitridae

Accipitridae is a family of birds of prey, which includes hawks, eagles, kites, harriers and Old World vultures. These birds have powerful hooked beaks for tearing flesh from their prey, strong legs, powerful talons and keen eyesight.

Bearded vulture, Gypaetus barbatus
Egyptian vulture, Neophron percnopterus
European honey-buzzard, Pernis apivorus
Oriental honey-buzzard, Pernis ptilorhynchus
Cinereous vulture, Aegypius monachus
White-rumped vulture, Gyps bengalensis (A)
Himalayan griffon, Gyps himalayensis (A)
Eurasian griffon, Gyps fulvus
Short-toed snake-eagle, Circaetus gallicus
Mountain hawk-eagle, Nisaetus nipalensis
Lesser spotted eagle, Clanga pomarina
Greater spotted eagle, Clanga clanga
Booted eagle, Hieraaetus pennatus
Steppe eagle, Aquila nipalensis
Imperial eagle, Aquila heliaca
Golden eagle, Aquila chrysaetos
Gray-faced buzzard, Butastur indicus
Eurasian marsh-harrier, Circus aeruginosus
Eastern marsh-harrier, Circus spilonotus
Hen harrier, Circus cyaneus
Pallid harrier, Circus macrourus
Pied harrier, Circus melanoleucos
Montagu's harrier, Circus pygargus
Levant sparrowhawk, Accipiter brevipes
Chinese goshawk, Accipiter soloensis
Japanese sparrowhawk, Accipiter gularis
Eurasian sparrowhawk, Accipiter nisus
Northern goshawk, Accipiter gentilis
Red kite, Milvus milvus
Black kite, Milvus migrans
Bald eagle, Haliaeetus leucocephalus (A)
White-tailed eagle, Haliaeetus albicilla
Pallas's fish-eagle, Haliaeetus leucoryphus (A)
Steller's sea-eagle, Haliaeetus pelagicus
Rough-legged hawk, Buteo lagopus
Common buzzard, Buteo buteo
Eastern buzzard, Buteo japonicus
Long-legged buzzard, Buteo rufinus
Upland buzzard, Buteo hemilasius

Barn owls
Order: StrigiformesFamily: Tytonidae

Barn owls are medium to large owls with large heads and characteristic heart-shaped faces. They have long strong legs with powerful talons. 1 species occurs in Russia.

Barn owl, Tyto alba

Owls
Order: StrigiformesFamily: Strigidae

The typical owls are small to large solitary nocturnal birds of prey. They have large forward-facing eyes and ears, a hawk-like beak and a conspicuous circle of feathers around each eye called a facial disk.

Japanese scops-owl, Otus semitorques
Eurasian scops-owl, Otus scops
Oriental scops-owl, Otus sunia
Eurasian eagle-owl, Bubo bubo
Snowy owl, Bubo scandiacus
Blakiston's fish-owl, Ketupa blakistoni
Northern hawk owl, Surnia ulula
Eurasian pygmy-owl, Glaucidium passerinum
Little owl, Athene noctua
Tawny owl, Strix aluco
Ural owl, Strix uralensis
Great gray owl, Strix nebulosa
Long-eared owl, Asio otus
Short-eared owl, Asio flammeus
Boreal owl, Aegolius funereus
Brown boobook, Ninox scutulata
Northern boobook, Ninox japonica

Hoopoes
Order: BucerotiformesFamily: Upupidae

Hoopoes have black, white and orangey-pink colouring with a large erectile crest on their head. 1 species occurs in Russia.

Eurasian hoopoe, Upupa epops

Kingfishers
Order: CoraciiformesFamily: Alcedinidae

Kingfishers are medium-sized birds with large heads, long, pointed bills, short legs and stubby tails. There are 5 species which occur in Russia.

Common kingfisher, Alcedo atthis
Ruddy kingfisher, Halcyon coromanda (A)
Black-capped kingfisher, Halcyon pileata (A)
Crested kingfisher, Megaceryle lugubris
Pied kingfisher, Ceryle rudis (A)

Bee-eaters
Order: CoraciiformesFamily: Meropidae

The bee-eaters are a group of near passerine birds in the family Meropidae. Most species are found in Africa but others occur in southern Europe, Madagascar, Australia and New Guinea. They are characterised by richly coloured plumage, slender bodies and usually elongated central tail feathers. All are colourful and have long downturned bills and pointed wings, which give them a swallow-like appearance when seen from afar.

Blue-cheeked bee-eater, Merops persicus
European bee-eater, Merops apiaster

Rollers
Order: CoraciiformesFamily: Coraciidae

Rollers resemble crows in size and build, but are more closely related to the kingfishers and bee-eaters. They share the colourful appearance of those groups with blues and browns predominating. The two inner front toes are connected, but the outer toe is not.

European roller, Coracias garrulus
Dollarbird, Eurystomus orientalis

Woodpeckers
Order: PiciformesFamily: Picidae

Woodpeckers are small to medium-sized birds with chisel-like beaks, short legs, stiff tails and long tongues used for capturing insects. Some species have feet with two toes pointing forward and two backward, while several species have only three toes. Many woodpeckers have the habit of tapping noisily on tree trunks with their beaks.

Eurasian wryneck, Jynx torquilla
Eurasian three-toed woodpecker, Picoides tridactylus
Gray-capped pygmy woodpecker, Yungipicus canicapillus
Japanese pygmy woodpecker, Yungipicus kizuki
Middle spotted woodpecker, Dendrocoptes medius
Rufous-bellied woodpecker, Dendrocopos hyperythrus
White-backed woodpecker, Dendrocopos leucotos
Great spotted woodpecker, Dendrocopos major
Syrian woodpecker, Dendrocopos syriacus
Lesser spotted woodpecker, Dryobates minor
Gray-headed woodpecker, Picus canus
Eurasian green woodpecker, Picus viridis
Black woodpecker, Dryocopus martius

Falcons and caracaras
Order: FalconiformesFamily: Falconidae

Falconidae is a family of diurnal birds of prey. They differ from hawks, eagles and kites in that they kill with their beaks instead of their talons.

Lesser kestrel, Falco naumanni
Eurasian kestrel, Falco tinnunculus
Red-footed falcon, Falco vespertinus
Amur falcon, Falco amurensis
Merlin, Falco columbarius
Eurasian hobby, Falco subbuteo
Saker falcon, Falco cherrug
Gyrfalcon, Falco rusticolus
Peregrine falcon, Falco peregrinus

Pittas
Order: PasseriformesFamily: Pittidae

Pittas are medium-sized by passerine standards and are stocky, with fairly long, strong legs, short tails and stout bills. Many are brightly coloured. They spend the majority of their time on wet forest floors, eating snails, insects and similar invertebrates.

Fairy pitta, Pitta nympha (A)

Cuckooshrikes
Order: PasseriformesFamily: Campephagidae

The cuckooshrikes are small to medium-sized passerine birds. They are predominantly greyish with white and black, although some species are brightly coloured.

Ashy minivet, Pericrocotus divaricatus

Old World orioles
Order: PasseriformesFamily: Oriolidae

The Old World orioles are colourful passerine birds. They are not related to the New World orioles.

Eurasian golden oriole, Oriolus oriolus
Black-naped oriole, Oriolus chinensis

Drongos
Order: PasseriformesFamily: Dicruridae

The drongos are mostly black or dark grey in colour, sometimes with metallic tints. They have long forked tails, and some Asian species have elaborate tail decorations. They have short legs and sit very upright when perched, like a shrike. They flycatch or take prey from the ground.

Black drongo, Dicrurus macrocercus (A)
Ashy drongo, Dicrurus leucophaeus (A)
Hair-crested drongo, Dicrurus hottentottus (A)

Monarch flycatchers
Order: PasseriformesFamily: Monarchidae

The monarch flycatchers are small to medium-sized insectivorous passerines which hunt by flycatching.

Japanese paradise-flycatcher, Terpsiphone atrocaudata (A)
Amur paradise-flycatcher, Terpsiphone incei

Shrikes
Order: PasseriformesFamily: Laniidae

Shrikes are passerine birds known for their habit of catching other birds and small animals and impaling the uneaten portions of their bodies on thorns. A typical shrike's beak is hooked, like a bird of prey.

Tiger shrike, Lanius tigrinus
Bull-headed shrike, Lanius bucephalus
Red-backed shrike, Lanius collurio
Red-tailed shrike, Lanius phoenicuroides
Isabelline shrike, Lanius isabellinus
Brown shrike, Lanius cristatus
Long-tailed shrike, Lanius schach (A)
Northern shrike, Lanius borealis
Great gray shrike, Lanius excubitor
Lesser gray shrike, Lanius minor
Chinese gray shrike, Lanius sphenocercus
Masked shrike, Lanius nubicus (A)
Woodchat shrike, Lanius senator

Crows, jays, and magpies
Order: PasseriformesFamily: Corvidae

The family Corvidae includes crows, ravens, jays, choughs, magpies, treepies, nutcrackers and ground jays. Corvids are above average in size among the Passeriformes, and some of the larger species show high levels of intelligence.

Siberian jay, Perisoreus infaustus
Eurasian jay, Garrulus glandarius
Azure-winged magpie, Cyanopica cyana
Oriental magpie, Pica serica
Eurasian magpie, Pica pica
Eurasian nutcracker, Nucifraga caryocatactes
Red-billed chough, Pyrrhocorax pyrrhocorax
Yellow-billed chough, Pyrrhocorax graculus
Eurasian jackdaw, Corvus monedula
Daurian jackdaw, Corvus dauuricus
Rook, Corvus frugilegus
Carrion crow, Corvus corone (A)
Hooded crow, Corvus cornix
Large-billed crow, Corvus macrorhynchos
Brown-necked raven, Corvus ruficollis (A)
Common raven, Corvus corax

Fairy flycatchers
Order: PasseriformesFamily: Stenostiridae

Most of the species of this small family are found in Africa, though a few inhabit tropical Asia. They are not closely related to other birds called "flycatchers".

Gray-headed canary-flycatcher, Culicicapa ceylonensis (A)

Tits, chickadees and titmice
Order: PasseriformesFamily: Paridae

The Paridae are mainly small stocky woodland species with short stout bills. Some have crests. They are adaptable birds, with a mixed diet including seeds and insects.

Coal tit, Periparus ater
Yellow-bellied tit, Periparus venustulus (A)
Crested tit, Lophophanes cristatus
Varied tit, Sittiparus varius
Marsh tit, Poecile palustris
Willow tit, Poecile montana
Gray-headed chickadee, Poecile cincta
Eurasian blue tit, Cyanistes caeruleus
Azure tit, Cyanistes cyanus
Great tit, Parus major
Japanese tit, Parus minor

Penduline-tits
Order: PasseriformesFamily: Remizidae

The penduline-tits are a group of small passerine birds related to the true tits. They are insectivores.

Eurasian penduline-tit, Remiz pendulinus
White-crowned penduline-tit, Remiz coronatus
Chinese penduline-tit, Remiz consobrinus

Larks
Order: PasseriformesFamily: Alaudidae

Larks are small terrestrial birds with often extravagant songs and display flights. Most larks are fairly dull in appearance. Their food is insects and seeds.

Horned lark, Eremophila alpestris
Greater short-toed lark, Calandrella brachydactyla
Mongolian short-toed lark, Calandrella dukhunensis
Bimaculated lark, Melanocorypha bimaculata (A)
Calandra lark, Melanocorypha calandra
Black lark, Melanocorypha yeltoniensis
Mongolian lark, Melanocorypha mongolica
Asian short-toed lark, Alaudala cheleensis
Turkestan short-toed lark, Alaudala heinei
Wood lark, Lullula arborea
White-winged lark, Alauda leucoptera
Eurasian skylark, Alauda arvensis
Oriental skylark, Alauda gulgula (A)
Crested lark, Galerida cristata

Bearded reedling
Order: PasseriformesFamily: Panuridae

This species, the only one in its family, is found in reed beds throughout temperate Europe and Asia.

Bearded reedling, Panurus biarmicus

Cisticolas and allies
Order: PasseriformesFamily: Cisticolidae

The Cisticolidae are warblers found mainly in warmer southern regions of the Old World. They are generally very small birds of drab brown or grey appearance found in open country such as grassland or scrub.

Zitting cisticola, Cisticola juncidis (A)

Reed warblers and allies
Order: PasseriformesFamily: Acrocephalidae

The members of this family are usually rather large for "warblers". Most are rather plain olivaceous brown above with much yellow to beige below. They are usually found in open woodland, reedbeds, or tall grass. The family occurs mostly in southern to western Eurasia and surroundings, but it also ranges far into the Pacific, with some species in Africa.

Thick-billed warbler, Arundinax aedon
Booted warbler, Iduna caligata
Sykes's warbler, Iduna rama
Eastern olivaceous warbler, Iduna pallida
Icterine warbler, Hippolais icterina
Aquatic warbler, Acrocephalus paludicola
Black-browed reed warbler, Acrocephalus bistrigiceps
Moustached warbler, Acrocephalus melanopogon
Sedge warbler, Acrocephalus schoenobaenus
Paddyfield warbler, Acrocephalus agricola
Manchurian reed warbler, Acrocephalus tangorum
Blyth's reed warbler, Acrocephalus dumetorum
Marsh warbler, Acrocephalus palustris
Common reed warbler, Acrocephalus scirpaceus
Great reed warbler, Acrocephalus arundinaceus
Oriental reed warbler, Acrocephalus orientalis

Grassbirds and allies
Order: PasseriformesFamily: Locustellidae

Locustellidae are a family of small insectivorous songbirds found mainly in Eurasia, Africa, and the Australian region. They are smallish birds with tails that are usually long and pointed, and tend to be drab brownish or buffy all over.

Gray's grasshopper warbler, Helopsaltes fasciolatus
Sakhalin grasshopper warbler, Helopsaltes amnicola
Marsh grassbird, Helopsaltes pryeri
Pallas's grasshopper warbler, Helopsaltes certhiola
Middendorff's grasshopper warbler, Helopsaltes ochotensis
Pleske's grasshopper warbler, Helopsaltes pleskei
Lanceolated warbler, Locustella lanceolata
River warbler, Locustella fluviatilis
Savi's warbler, Locustella luscinioides
Chinese bush warbler, Locustella tacsanowskia
Common grasshopper-warbler, Locustella naevia
Baikal bush warbler, Locustella davidi

Swallows
Order: PasseriformesFamily: Hirundinidae

The family Hirundinidae is adapted to aerial feeding. They have a slender streamlined body, long pointed wings and a short bill with a wide gape. The feet are adapted to perching rather than walking, and the front toes are partially joined at the base.

Purple martin, Progne subis (A)
Tree swallow, Tachycineta bicolor (A)
Bank swallow, Riparia riparia
Pale sand martin, Riparia diluta
Eurasian crag-martin, Ptyonoprogne rupestris
Barn swallow, Hirundo rustica
Red-rumped swallow, Cecropis daurica
Cliff swallow, Petrochelidon pyrrhonota (A)
Common house-martin, Delichon urbica
Asian house-martin, Delichon dasypus

Bulbuls
Order: PasseriformesFamily: Pycnonotidae

Bulbuls are medium-sized songbirds. Some are colourful with yellow, red or orange vents, cheeks, throats or supercilia, but most are drab, with uniform olive-brown to black plumage. Some species have distinct crests.

Brown-eared bulbul, Hypsipetes amaurotis (A)

Leaf warblers
Order: PasseriformesFamily: Phylloscopidae

Leaf warblers are a family of small insectivorous birds found mostly in Eurasia and ranging into Wallacea and Africa. The species are of various sizes, often green-plumaged above and yellow below, or more subdued with grayish-green to grayish-brown colors.

Wood warbler, Phylloscopus sibilatrix
Yellow-browed warbler, Phylloscopus inornatus
Hume's warbler, Phylloscopus humei
Pallas's leaf warbler, Phylloscopus proregulus
Radde's warbler, Phylloscopus schwarzi
Sulphur-bellied warbler, Phylloscopus griseolus
Dusky warbler, Phylloscopus fuscatus
Willow warbler, Phylloscopus trochilus
Mountain chiffchaff, Phylloscopus sindianus
Common chiffchaff, Phylloscopus collybita
Iberian chiffchaff, Phylloscopus ibericus (A)
Eastern crowned warbler, Phylloscopus coronatus
Green warbler, Phylloscopus nitidus
Greenish warbler, Phylloscopus trochiloides
Two-barred warbler, Phylloscopus plumbeitarsus
Pale-legged leaf warbler, Phylloscopus tenellipes
Sakhalin leaf warbler, Phylloscopus borealoides
Arctic warbler, Phylloscopus borealis
Kamchatka leaf warbler, Phylloscopus examinandus

Bush warblers and allies
Order: PasseriformesFamily: Scotocercidae

The members of this family are found throughout Africa, Asia, and Polynesia. Their taxonomy is in flux, and some authorities place some genera in other families.

Asian stubtail, Urosphena squameiceps
Cetti's warbler, Cettia cetti
Japanese bush warbler, Horornis diphone
Manchurian bush warbler, Horornis borealis

Long-tailed tits
Order: PasseriformesFamily: Aegithalidae

Long-tailed tits are a group of small passerine birds with medium to long tails. They make woven bag nests in trees. Most eat a mixed diet which includes insects.

Long-tailed tit, Aegithalos caudatus

Sylviid warblers, parrotbills, and allies
Order: PasseriformesFamily: Sylviidae

The family Sylviidae is a group of small insectivorous passerine birds. They mainly occur as breeding species, as the common name implies, in Europe, Asia and, to a lesser extent, Africa. Most are of generally undistinguished appearance, but many have distinctive songs.

Eurasian blackcap, Sylvia atricapilla
Garden warbler, Sylvia borin
Asian desert warbler, Curruca nana
Barred warbler, Curruca nisoria
Lesser whitethroat, Curruca curruca
Menetries's warbler, Curruca mystacea
Eastern subalpine warbler, Curruca cantillans (A)
Greater whitethroat, Curruca communis
Reed parrotbill, Calamornis heudei
Vinous-throated parrotbill, Sinosuthora webbiana

White-eyes, yuhinas, and allies
Order: PasseriformesFamily: Zosteropidae

The white-eyes are small and mostly undistinguished, their plumage above being generally some dull colour like greenish-olive, but some species have a white or bright yellow throat, breast or lower parts, and several have buff flanks. As their name suggests, many species have a white ring around each eye. There are 2 species which occur in Russia.

Chestnut-flanked white-eye, Zosterops erythropleurus
Warbling white-eye, Zosterops japonicus

Kinglets
Order: PasseriformesFamily: Regulidae

The kinglets, also called crests, are a small group of birds often included in the Old World warblers, but frequently given family status because they also resemble the titmice.

Ruby-crowned kinglet, Regulus calendula (A)
Goldcrest, Regulus regulus
Common firecrest, Regulus ignicapillus

Wallcreeper
Order: PasseriformesFamily: Tichodromidae

The wallcreeper is a small bird related to the nuthatch family, which has stunning crimson, grey and black plumage.

Wallcreeper, Tichodroma muraria

Nuthatches
Order: PasseriformesFamily: Sittidae

Nuthatches are small woodland birds. They have the unusual ability to climb down trees head first, unlike other birds which can only go upwards. Nuthatches have big heads, short tails and powerful bills and feet.

Eurasian nuthatch, Sitta europaea
Krüper's nuthatch, Sitta krueperi
Snowy-browed nuthatch, Sitta villosa

Treecreepers
Order: PasseriformesFamily: Certhiidae

Treecreepers are small woodland birds, brown above and white below. They have thin pointed down-curved bills, which they use to extricate insects from bark. They have stiff tail feathers, like woodpeckers, which they use to support themselves on vertical trees.

Eurasian treecreeper, Certhia familiaris
Short-toed treecreeper, Certhia brachydactyla

Wrens
Order: PasseriformesFamily: Troglodytidae

The wrens are mainly small and inconspicuous except for their loud songs. These birds have short wings and thin down-turned bills. Several species often hold their tails upright. All are insectivorous.

Eurasian wren, Troglodytes troglodytes
Pacific wren, Troglodytes pacificus

Dippers
Order: PasseriformesFamily: Cinclidae

Dippers are a group of perching birds whose habitat includes aquatic environments in the Americas, Europe and Asia. They are named for their bobbing or dipping movements.

White-throated dipper, Cinclus cinclus
Brown dipper, Cinclus pallasii

Starlings
Order: PasseriformesFamily: Sturnidae

Starlings are small to medium-sized passerine birds. Their flight is strong and direct and they are very gregarious. Their preferred habitat is fairly open country. They eat insects and fruit. Plumage is typically dark with a metallic sheen.

European starling, Sturnus vulgaris
Rosy starling, Pastor roseus
Daurian starling, Agropsar sturninus
Chestnut-cheeked starling, Agropsar philippensis
White-shouldered starling, Sturnia sinensis (A)
White-cheeked starling, Spodiopsar cineraceus
Common myna, Acridotheres tristis (A)
Crested myna, Acridotheres cristatellus (A)

Thrushes and allies
Order: PasseriformesFamily: Turdidae

The thrushes are a group of passerine birds that occur mainly in the Old World. They are plump, soft plumaged, small to medium-sized insectivores or sometimes omnivores, often feeding on the ground. Many have attractive songs.

White's thrush, Zoothera aurea
Scaly thrush, Zoothera dauma
Varied thrush, Ixoreus naevius (A)
Gray-cheeked thrush, Catharus minimus
Swainson's thrush, Catharus ustulatus (A)
Hermit thrush, Catharus guttatus (A)
Siberian thrush, Geokichla sibirica
Mistle thrush, Turdus viscivorus
Song thrush, Turdus philomelos
Redwing, Turdus iliacus
Eurasian blackbird, Turdus merula
American robin, Turdus migratorius (A)
Japanese thrush, Turdus cardis (A)
Gray-backed thrush, Turdus hortulorum
Eyebrowed thrush, Turdus obscurus
Brown-headed thrush, Turdus chrysolaus
Pale thrush, Turdus pallidus
Fieldfare, Turdus pilaris
Ring ouzel, Turdus torquatus
Black-throated thrush, Turdus atrogularis
Red-throated thrush, Turdus ruficollis
Dusky thrush, Turdus eunomus
Naumann's thrush, Turdus naumanni

Old World flycatchers
Order: PasseriformesFamily: Muscicapidae

Old World flycatchers are a large group of small passerine birds native to the Old World. They are mainly small arboreal insectivores. The appearance of these birds is highly varied, but they mostly have weak songs and harsh calls.

Gray-streaked flycatcher, Muscicapa griseisticta
Dark-sided flycatcher, Muscicapa sibirica
Asian brown flycatcher, Muscicapa dauurica
Spotted flycatcher, Muscicapa striata
Rufous-tailed scrub-robin, Cercotrichas galactotes
Blue-and-white flycatcher, Cyanoptila cyanomelana
Zappey's flycatcher, Cyanoptila cumatilis
European robin, Erithacus rubecula
Rufous-tailed robin, Larvivora sibilans
Japanese robin, Larvivora akahige
Siberian blue robin, Larvivora cyane
White-throated robin, Irania gutturalis (A)
Thrush nightingale, Luscinia luscinia
Common nightingale, Luscinia megarhynchos
Bluethroat, Luscinia svecica
Blue whistling-thrush, Myophonus caeruleus (A)
Siberian rubythroat, Calliope calliope
Red-flanked bluetail, Tarsiger cyanurus
Yellow-rumped flycatcher, Ficedula zanthopygia
Narcissus flycatcher, Ficedula narcissina
Mugimaki flycatcher, Ficedula mugimaki
Taiga flycatcher, Ficedula albicilla
Red-breasted flycatcher, Ficedula parva
Semicollared flycatcher, Ficedula semitorquata
European pied flycatcher, Ficedula hypoleuca
Collared flycatcher, Ficedula albicollis
Rufous-backed redstart, Phoenicurus erythronota
Blue-capped redstart, Phoenicurus caeruleocephalus (A)
Common redstart, Phoenicurus phoenicurus
White-winged redstart, Phoenicurus erythrogaster
Black redstart, Phoenicurus ochruros
Daurian redstart, Phoenicurus auroreus
White-throated rock-thrush, Monticola gularis
Rufous-tailed rock-thrush, Monticola saxatilis
Blue rock-thrush, Monticola solitarius
Whinchat, Saxicola rubetra
White-throated bushchat, Saxicola insignis
European stonechat, Saxicola rubicola
Siberian stonechat, Saxicola maurus
Amur stonechat, Saxicola stejnegeri
Pied bushchat, Saxicola caprata (A)
Northern wheatear, Oenanthe oenanthe
Isabelline wheatear, Oenanthe isabellina
Desert wheatear, Oenanthe deserti
Pied wheatear, Oenanthe pleschanka
Eastern black-eared wheatear, Oenanthe melanoleuca
Variable wheatear, Oenanthe picata (A)
Kurdish wheatear, Oenanthe xanthoprymna (A)

Waxwings
Order: PasseriformesFamily: Bombycillidae

The waxwings are a group of birds with soft silky plumage and unique red tips to some of the wing feathers. In the Bohemian and cedar waxwings, these tips look like sealing wax and give the group its name. These are arboreal birds of northern forests. They live on insects in summer and berries in winter.

Bohemian waxwing, Bombycilla garrulus
Japanese waxwing, Bombycilla japonica

Accentors
Order: PasseriformesFamily: Prunellidae

The accentors are in the only bird family, Prunellidae, which is completely endemic to the Palearctic. They are small, fairly drab species superficially similar to sparrows.

Alpine accentor, Prunella collaris
Altai accentor, Prunella himalayana
Siberian accentor, Prunella montanella
Brown accentor, Prunella fulvescens
Black-throated accentor, Prunella atrogularis
Dunnock, Prunella modularis
Japanese accentor, Prunella rubida

Old World sparrows
Order: PasseriformesFamily: Passeridae

Old World sparrows are small passerine birds. In general, sparrows tend to be small, plump, brown or grey birds with short tails and short powerful beaks. Sparrows are seed eaters, but they also consume small insects.

House sparrow, Passer domesticus
Spanish sparrow, Passer hispaniolensis
Russet sparrow, Passer cinnamomeus
Eurasian tree sparrow, Passer montanus
Rock sparrow, Petronia petronia
Pale rockfinch, Carpospiza brachydactyla (A)
White-winged snowfinch, Montifringilla nivalis
Pere David's snowfinch, Montifringilla davidiana

Wagtails and pipits
Order: PasseriformesFamily: Motacillidae

Motacillidae is a family of small passerine birds with medium to long tails. They include the wagtails, longclaws and pipits. They are slender, ground feeding insectivores of open country.

Forest wagtail, Dendronanthus indicus
Gray wagtail, Motacilla cinerea
Western yellow wagtail, Motacilla flava
Eastern yellow wagtail, Motacilla tschutschensis
Citrine wagtail, Motacilla citreola
Japanese wagtail, Motacilla grandis (A)
White wagtail, Motacilla alba
Richard's pipit, Anthus richardi
Blyth's pipit, Anthus godlewskii
Tawny pipit, Anthus campestris
Meadow pipit, Anthus pratensis
Tree pipit, Anthus trivialis
Olive-backed pipit, Anthus hodgsoni
Pechora pipit, Anthus gustavi
Red-throated pipit, Anthus cervinus
Water pipit, Anthus spinoletta
Rock pipit, Anthus petrosus
American pipit, Anthus rubescens

Finches, euphonias, and allies
Order: PasseriformesFamily: Fringillidae

Finches are seed-eating passerine birds, that are small to moderately large and have a strong beak, usually conical and in some species very large. All have twelve tail feathers and nine primaries. These birds have a bouncing flight with alternating bouts of flapping and gliding on closed wings, and most sing well.

Common chaffinch, Fringilla coelebs
Brambling, Fringilla montifringilla
White-winged grosbeak, Mycerobas carnipes (A)
Hawfinch, Coccothraustes coccothraustes
Yellow-billed grosbeak, Eophona migratoria
Japanese grosbeak, Eophona personata
Common rosefinch, Carpodacus erythrinus
Red-mantled rosefinch, Carpodacus rhodochlamys
Great rosefinch, Carpodacus rubicilla
Long-tailed rosefinch, Carpodacus sibiricus
Pallas's rosefinch, Carpodacus roseus
Pine grosbeak, Pinicola enucleator
Eurasian bullfinch, Pyrrhula pyrrhula
Crimson-winged finch, Rhodopechys sanguineus (A)
Trumpeter finch, Bucanetes githagineus
Mongolian finch, Bucanetes mongolicus
Plain mountain finch, Leucosticte nemoricola
Black-headed mountain finch, Leucosticte brandti
Asian rosy-finch, Leucosticte arctoa
Gray-crowned rosy-finch, Leucosticte tephrocotis
European greenfinch, Chloris chloris
Oriental greenfinch, Chloris sinica
Twite, Linaria flavirostris
Eurasian linnet, Linaria cannabina
Common redpoll, Acanthis flammea
Lesser redpoll, Acanthis cabaret (A)
Hoary redpoll, Acanthis hornemanni
Parrot crossbill, Loxia pytyopsittacus
Red crossbill, Loxia curvirostra
White-winged crossbill, Loxia leucoptera
European goldfinch, Carduelis carduelis
European serin, Serinus serinus
Fire-fronted serin, Serinus pusillus
Eurasian siskin, Spinus spinus
Pine siskin, Spinus pinus (A)

Longspurs and snow buntings
Order: PasseriformesFamily: Calcariidae

The Calcariidae are a group of passerine birds which had been traditionally grouped with the New World sparrows, but differ in a number of respects and are usually found in open grassy areas.

Lapland longspur, Calcarius lapponicus
Snow bunting, Plectrophenax nivalis
McKay's bunting, Plectrophenax hyperboreus (A)

Old World buntings
Order: PasseriformesFamily: Emberizidae

The emberizids are a large family of passerine birds. They are seed-eating birds with distinctively shaped bills. Many emberizid species have distinctive head patterns.

Black-headed bunting, Emberiza melanocephala
Red-headed bunting, Emberiza bruniceps
Corn bunting, Emberiza calandra
Chestnut-eared bunting, Emberiza fucata
Rufous-backed bunting, Emberiza jankowskii (Ext)
Rock bunting, Emberiza cia
Godlewski's bunting, Emberiza godlewskii
Meadow bunting, Emberiza cioides
Cirl bunting, Emberiza cirlus (A)
Yellowhammer, Emberiza citrinella
Pine bunting, Emberiza leucocephalos
Gray-necked bunting, Emberiza buchanani
Ortolan bunting, Emberiza hortulana
Cretzschmar's bunting, Emberiza caesia (A)
Yellow-throated bunting, Emberiza elegans
Ochre-rumped bunting, Emberiza yessoensis
Pallas's bunting, Emberiza pallasi
Reed bunting, Emberiza schoeniclus
Yellow-breasted bunting, Emberiza aureola
Little bunting, Emberiza pusilla
Yellow-browed bunting, Emberiza chrysophrys
Rustic bunting, Emberiza rustica
Yellow bunting, Emberiza sulphurata (A)
Black-faced bunting, Emberiza spodocephala
Masked bunting, Emberiza personata
Chestnut bunting, Emberiza rutila
Yellow-browed bunting, Emberiza chrysophrys
Tristram's bunting, Emberiza tristrami
Gray bunting, Emberiza variabilis

New World sparrows
Order: PasseriformesFamily: Passerellidae

Until 2017, these species were considered part of the family Emberizidae. Most of the species are known as sparrows, but these birds are not closely related to the Old World sparrows which are in the family Passeridae. Many of these have distinctive head patterns.

Chipping sparrow, Spizella passerina (A)
American tree sparrow, Spizelloides arborea (A)
Fox sparrow, Passerella iliaca (A)
Dark-eyed junco, Junco hyemalis (A)
White-crowned sparrow, Zonotrichia leucophrys (A)
Golden-crowned sparrow, Zonotrichia atricapilla (A)
Savannah sparrow, Passerculus sandwichensis
Song sparrow, Melospiza melodia (A)
Swamp sparrow, Melospiza georgiana (A)

Troupials and allies
Order: PasseriformesFamily: Icteridae

The icterids are a group of small to medium-sized, often colourful, passerine birds restricted to the New World and include the grackles, New World blackbirds and New World orioles. Most species have black as the predominant plumage colour, often enlivened by yellow, orange or red.

Western meadowlark, Sturnella neglecta (A)
Rusty blackbird, Euphagus carolinus (A)

New World warblers
Order: PasseriformesFamily: Parulidae

The New World warblers are a group of small, often colourful, passerine birds restricted to the New World. Most are arboreal, but some are terrestrial. Most members of this family are insectivores.

Northern waterthrush, Parkesia noveboracensis (A)
Yellow-rumped warbler, Setophaga coronata (A)
Wilson's warbler, Cardellina pusilla (A)

Cardinals and allies
Order: PasseriformesFamily: Cardinalidae

The cardinals are a family of robust seed-eating birds with strong bills. They are typically associated with open woodland. The sexes usually have distinct plumages.

Indigo bunting, Passerina cyanea (A)

See also
List of birds
Lists of birds by region

References

Lists of birds by country
Lists of birds of Asia
Lists of birds of Europe
 
Birds